Patricia Obregón may refer to:
 Patricia Obregón (swimmer)
 Patricia Obregón (archer)